Coccothrinax fagildei or Fagilde's palm, is a palm which is endemic to Cuba.

Henderson and colleagues (1995) considered C. fagildei to be a synonym of Coccothrinax miraguama.

References

fagildei
Trees of Cuba
Plants described in 1985